Troublesome Night 2 is a 1997 Hong Kong horror comedy film produced by Nam Yin and directed by Herman Yau. It is the second of the 20 films in the Troublesome Night film series.

Plot
The film consists of three segments. The first is about a girl who calls a radio station for comfort after her boyfriend died in a tragic incident. One of the DJs insensitively suggests that she should commit suicide to join her boyfriend. She heeds his suggestion and the DJ feels guilty when her ghost returns to haunt him. The second segment is about a group of friends on a voyage who encounter paranormal events after they rescue a mysterious woman from a boat wreckage. The third segment is about another DJ who quits his job after the untimely deaths of his colleagues. He becomes a street racer and stumbles upon a sinister ghost on the road.

Cast
 Louis Koo as Sam
 Simon Lui as Chai
 Allen Ting as Fai
 Chin Kar-lok as Chuen
 Wan Yue-hung as Sau
 Au-yeung Miu-chi as girl killed in accident
 Frankie Ng as Wah
 Amanda Lee as Anita
 Vincent Kok as manager
 Hui Fan as Anita's mother
 Cheung Tat-ming as Dan
 Wayne Lai as Curry
 Christine Ng as Miu
 Liz Kong as girl floating in sea
 Chan Chi-fai as motorbike racer
 Fong Yue as Auntie Six

External links
 
 

1997 films
1990s comedy horror films
Hong Kong comedy horror films
1990s Cantonese-language films
1997 horror films
Troublesome Night (film series)
Hong Kong ghost films
Films directed by Herman Yau
China Star Entertainment Group films
1997 comedy films
1990s Hong Kong films